Koszelewki  is a village in the administrative district of Gmina Rybno, within Działdowo County, Warmian-Masurian Voivodeship, in northern Poland. Between 1975–1998, the town was administratively part of the Ciechanów province.

References

Koszelewki